The General Data Protection Regulation (GDPR) is a European Union regulation that specifies standards for data protection and electronic privacy in the European Economic Area, and the rights of European citizens to control the processing and distribution of personally-identifiable information.

Violators of GDPR may be fined up to €20 million, or up to 4% of the annual worldwide turnover of the preceding financial year, whichever is greater. The following is a list of fines and notices issued under the GDPR, including reasoning.

Fines and notices

References

External links 

 European Data Protection Board

Privacy law
Law enforcement
Crime in the European Union